Pizzeria Dennis is a Finnish restaurant chain specialising in Italian cuisine and pizza. Dennis Rafkin opened the first restaurant on 1 May 1975 on Linnankatu in Turku, which is open to this day.

Dennis is the oldest still functioning pizzeria chain in Finland. Currently the chain includes four restaurants and a bakery selling products to retail. The menu includes pizza, pasta, risotto and salads. The bakery mainly sells fresh pizzas and products to the restaurant and hotel industry. The chain sells products throughout Finland through the S Group and Kesko chains.

The Dennis restaurants are located in Helsinki, Kirkkonummi and Turku. The total revenue of the Dennis chain owned by the Björkstén family is about 11 million euro and it employs about 120 people.

References

External links
 Official site

Restaurant chains in Finland
Pizza chains